Cody Lee Martin (born September 28, 1995) is an American professional basketball player for the Charlotte Hornets of the National Basketball Association (NBA). He played college basketball for the NC State Wolfpack and the Nevada Wolf Pack. He is the twin brother of Caleb Martin. He was drafted by the Charlotte Hornets in the second round of the 2019 NBA draft.

High school career
Martin played basketball for prep powerhouse Oak Hill Academy with his twin brother Caleb Martin. Prior to playing at Oak Hill, Cody and his brother played three seasons at Davie County High School in Mocksville, North Carolina. He also played football his freshman year of high school. The two chose North Carolina State University over Rutgers and Providence.

College career
As a sophomore at NC State, he averaged 6.0 points, 4.4 rebounds, and 2.3 assists per game. Following that season, the Martin twins chose to transfer to Nevada to play for coach Eric Musselman. After sitting out a season as a redshirt, Cody Martin was named Mountain West Conference defensive player of the year. He averaged 14 points, 6.3 rebounds and 4.7 assists per game and led the Wolf Pack to an NCAA Tournament appearance. After the season, he and his brother declared for the 2018 NBA draft without hiring an agent, thus preserving their ability to return to college. They were also participants for the NBA Draft Combine that year, but both ultimately decided to stay for their senior seasons in Nevada.

Coming into his senior season, Martin was named to the Preseason MWC Team.

Professional career

Charlotte Hornets (2019–present)

Martin was selected 36th overall in the 2019 NBA Draft by his hometown team, the Charlotte Hornets. On July 31, 2019, Martin signed with the Hornets. On October 25, 2019, Martin made his NBA debut, coming off from bench in a 99–121 loss to the Minnesota Timberwolves with four points, four rebounds, an assist and a steal. On November 29, 2019, Martin received his first assignment to the Hornets' NBA G League affiliate, the Greensboro Swarm. On February 13, 2020, he scored a season-high 13 points, alongside eight rebounds, three assists and three steals, in a 100–112 loss to the Orlando Magic. Martin again scored 13 points, alongside five rebounds, four assists and two steals, in a 103–104 loss to the San Antonio Spurs.

On April 25, 2021, Martin recorded a season-high 13 points, alongside ten rebounds, five assists and two blocks, in a 125–104 win over the Boston Celtics.

On December 15, 2021, Martin scored a career-high 21 points, alongside eight rebounds and three assists, in a 131–115 win over the San Antonio Spurs.

On July 2, 2022, Martin re-signed with the Hornets on a four-year, $32 million contract.

Career statistics

NBA

Regular season

|-
| style="text-align:left;"|
| style="text-align:left;"|Charlotte
| 48 || 3 || 18.8 || .430 || .234 || .646 || 3.3 || 2.0 || .8 || .2 || 5.0
|-
| style="text-align:left;"|
| style="text-align:left;"|Charlotte
| 52 || 10 || 16.3 || .441 || .276 || .581 || 3.1 || 1.7 || .7 || .2 || 4.0
|-
| style="text-align:left;"|
| style="text-align:left;"|Charlotte
| 71 || 11 || 26.3 || .482 || .384 || .701 || 4.0 || 2.5 || 1.2 || .5 || 7.7
|- class="sortbottom"
| style="text-align:center;" colspan="2"|Career
| 171 || 24 || 21.2 || .460 || .323 || .660 || 3.5 || 2.1 || 1.0 || .3 || 5.8

College

|-
| style="text-align:left;"| 2014–15
| style="text-align:left;"| NC State
|| 19 || 3 || 11.4 || .475 || .000 || .529 || 2.0 || 1.2 || 0.5 || 0.3 || 3.4
|-
| style="text-align:left;"| 2015–16 
| style="text-align:left;"| NC State
|| 33 || 16 || 25.9 || .467 || .429 || .597 || 4.4 || 2.3 || 1.2 || 0.4 || 6.0
|-
| style="text-align:left;"| 2017–18 
| style="text-align:left;"| Nevada 
|| 36 || 34 || 35.7 || .516 || .294 || .701 || 6.3 || 4.7 || 1.7 || 1.5 || 14.0
|-
| style="text-align:left;"| 2018–19
| style="text-align:left;"| Nevada
|| 34 || 34 || 34.4 || .505 || .358 || .763 || 4.5 || 4.9 || 1.4 || 0.7 || 12.1
|- class="sortbottom"
| style="text-align:center;" colspan="2"| Career
|| 122 || 87 || 28.9 || .501 || .325 || .689 || 4.6 || 3.6 || 1.3 || 0.8 || 9.7

References

External links

Nevada Wolf Pack bio
NC State Wolfpack bio
College stats @ sports-reference.com

1995 births
Living people
African-American basketball players
American men's basketball players
Basketball players from North Carolina
Charlotte Hornets draft picks
Charlotte Hornets players
Greensboro Swarm players
Identical twins
NC State Wolfpack men's basketball players
Nevada Wolf Pack men's basketball players
People from Mocksville, North Carolina
Small forwards
American twins
Twin sportspeople